The Tinaztepe class were two destroyers built in Italy for the Turkish Navy in the 1930s.

In contrast with other Italian destroyers built for export they had their main armament mounted in two twin turrets.

Ships

Notes

References

Destroyers of the Turkish Navy
Destroyer classes
 
Italy–Turkey relations